The 1997 Copa CONMEBOL was the sixth edition of CONMEBOL's annual club tournament. Teams that failed to qualify for the Copa Libertadores played in this tournament. Eighteen teams from the ten South American football confederations qualified for this tournament. A preliminary round was played to narrow the teams down to sixteen for the first round. Atlético Mineiro defeated the defending champion Lanús in the finals.

Qualified teams

Preliminary round

|}

Bracket

First round

|}

Quarterfinals

|}

Semifinals

|}

Finals

|}

External links
CONMEBOL 1997 at RSSSF
CONMEBOL 1997 at CONMEBOL Official Website

Copa CONMEBOL
3